The Associated Press (AP), United Press International (UPI), Pro Football Illustrated (PFI), New York Daily News (NYDN), Newspaper Enterprise Association (NEA), and Sporting News (SN) were among selectors of All-Pros for the 1961 National Football League season.

Offensive selections

Quarterbacks
 Sonny Jurgensen, Philadelphia Eagles (AP, PFI, UPI)
 Y. A. Tittle, New York Giants (UPI, NYDN-2)
 Bart Starr, Green Bay Packers (NEA-2, NYDN-2)

Halfbacks
 Paul Hornung, Green Bay Packers (PFI)

Fullbacks
 Jim Brown, Cleveland Browns (AP, NEA, NYDN, UPI)
 Jim Taylor, Green Bay Packers (NEA, PFI, NYDN-2, UPI-2)

Flankers
 Lenny Moore, Baltimore Colts (AP, NEA, NYDN, PFI, UPI)
 Tommy McDonald, Philadelphia Eagles (NEA-2, NYDN-2, UPI-2)

Ends
 Del Shofner, New York Giants (AP, NEA, NYDN, PFI, UPI)
 Red Phillips, Los Angeles Rams (AP, NYDN, UPI, NEA-2)
 Mike Ditka, Chicago Bears (NEA, NYDN-2, UPI-2)
 Buddy Dial, Pittsburgh Steelers (NYDN-2)
 Ron Kramer, Green Bay Packers (PFI)

Tackles
 Jim Parker, Baltimore Colts (AP, NEA, NYDN, UPI-2)
 Rosey Brown, New York Giants (AP, NEA, NYDN, PFI, UPI)
 Forrest Gregg, Green Bay Packers (PFI, UPI, NYDN-2)
 Mike McCormack, Cleveland Browns (NEA-2, NYDN-2, UPI-2)
 Bob St. Clair, San Francisco 49ers (NEA-2)

Guards
 Fred Thurston, Green Bay Packers (AP, NEA, NYDN, PFI, UPI)
 Jim Ray Smith, Cleveland Browns (AP, NEA, NYDN, PFI, UPI)
 Bruce Bosley, San Francisco 49ers (NEA-2)
 John Nisby, Pittsburgh Steelers (NEA-2)
 Jack Stroud, New York Giants (NYDN-2, UPI-2)
 Jerry Kramer, Green Bay Packers (NYDN-2)
 Stan Jones, Chicago Bears (UPI-2)

Centers
 Jim Ringo, Green Bay Packers (AP, NEA, NYDN, PFI, UPI)
 Ray Wietecha, New York Giants (NEA-2, NYDN-2)
 Chuck Bednarik, Philadelphia Eagles (UPI-2)

Defensive selections

Defensive ends
 Gino Marchetti, Baltimore Colts (AP, NEA, NYDN, PFI, UPI)
 Jim Katcavage, New York Giants (AP, NYDN, PFI, UPI, NEA-2)
 Doug Atkins, Chicago Bears (NEA, NYDN-2)
 Andy Robustelli, New York Giants (NEA-2, NYDN-2, UPI-2)
 Leo Sugar, Philadelphia Eagles (UPI-2)

Defensive tackles
 Henry Jordan, Green Bay Packers (AP, NEA, NYDN, PFI, UPI)
 Alex Karras, Detroit Lions (AP, PFI, UPI, NYDN-2)
 Roger Brown, Detroit Lions (NEA-2, UPI-2)
 Rosey Grier, New York Giants (NYDN-2)
 Leo Nomellini, San Francisco 49ers (NEA-2)
 Bob Gain, Cleveland Browns (UPI-2)

Linebackers
 Bill George, Chicago Bears (AP, NEA, PFI, UPI-2)
 Bill Forester, Green Bay Packers (AP, NYDN, PFI, UPI, NEA-2)
 Joe Schmidt, Detroit Lions (AP, NEA, NYDN, UPI)
 Dan Currie, Green Bay Packers (NEA, PFI, UPI)
 Maxie Baughan, Philadelphia Eagles (NYDN, UPI-2)
 Sam Huff, New York Giants (NEA-2, NYDN-2)
 John Reger, Pittsburgh Steelers (NEA-2, NYDN-2)
 Cliff Livingston, New York Giants (NYDN-2, UPI-2)

Defensive backs
 Jimmy Patton, New York Giants (AP, NEA, NYDN, PFI, UPI)
 Erich Barnes, New York Giants (AP, NYDN, UPI)
 Jesse Whittenton, Green Bay Packers (AP, PFI, UPI, NEA-2, NYDN-2)
 Night Train Lane, Detroit Lions (AP, NEA, PFI, NYDN-2, UPI-2)
 Jimmy Hill, St. Louis Cardinals (NEA)
 Johnny Sample, Pittsburgh Steelers (PFI)
 Don Burroughs, Philadelphia Eagles (NEA-2, NYDN-2, UPI-2)
 Dick Lynch, New York Giants (UPI-2)
 Eddie Dove, San Francisco 49ers (UPI-2)

Special teams selections

Kickers
 Paul Hornung, Green Bay Packers (AP, NYDN, UPI, NEA-2)

Punters
 Jerry Norton, St. Louis Cardinals (NEA, NYDN-2)
 Yale Lary, Detroit Lions (NEA-2)

Return specialists
 Abe Woodson, San Francisco 49ers (NYDN)
 Jon Arnett, Los Angeles Rams (NEA-2, NYDN-2, UPI-2)
 Johnny Sample, Pittsburgh Steelers (NYDN, PFI, UPI, NEA-2)

References

External links
 1961 NFL All-Pros – Pro-Football-Reference

All-Pro Teams
1961 National Football League season